The giant squid (Architeuthis dux) is a species of deep-ocean dwelling squid in the family Architeuthidae.

The number of different giant squid species has been debated, but genetic research suggests that only one species exists.

The first images of the animal in its natural habitat were taken in 2004 by a Japanese team.

Range and habitat 
The giant squid is widespread, occurring in all of the world's oceans. It is usually found near continental and island slopes from the North Atlantic Ocean, especially Newfoundland, Norway, the northern British Isles, Spain and the oceanic islands of the Azores and Madeira, to the South Atlantic around southern Africa, the North Pacific around Japan, and the southwestern Pacific around New Zealand and Australia. Specimens are rare in tropical and polar latitudes.

The vertical distribution of giant squid is incompletely known, but data from trawled specimens and sperm whale diving behavior suggest it spans a large range of depths, possibly .

Morphology and anatomy 

Like all squid, a giant squid has a mantle (torso), eight arms, and two longer tentacles (the longest known tentacles of any cephalopod). The arms and tentacles account for much of the squid's great length, making it much lighter than its chief predator, the sperm whale. Scientifically documented specimens have masses of hundreds, rather than thousands, of kilograms.

The inside surfaces of the arms and tentacles are lined with hundreds of subspherical suction cups,  in diameter, each mounted on a stalk. The circumference of these suckers is lined with sharp, finely serrated rings of chitin. The perforation of these teeth and the suction of the cups serve to attach the squid to its prey. It is common to find circular scars from the suckers on or close to the head of sperm whales that have attacked giant squid.

Each tentacular club is divided into three regions—the carpus ("wrist"), manus ("hand") and dactylus ("finger"). The carpus has a dense cluster of cups, in six or seven irregular, transverse rows. The manus is broader, closer to the end of the club, and has enlarged suckers in two medial rows. The dactylus is the tip. The bases of all the arms and tentacles are arranged in a circle surrounding the animal's single, parrot-like beak, as in other cephalopods.

Giant squid have small fins at the rear of their mantles used for locomotion. Like other cephalopods, they are propelled by jet—by pulling water into the mantle cavity, and pushing it through the siphon, in gentle, rhythmic pulses. They can also move quickly by expanding the cavity to fill it with water, then contracting muscles to jet water through the siphon. Giant squid breathe using two large gills inside the mantle cavity. The circulatory system is closed, which is a distinct characteristic of cephalopods. Like other squid, they contain dark ink.

The giant squid has a sophisticated nervous system and complex brain, attracting great interest from scientists. It also has the largest eyes of any living creature except perhaps the colossal squid—up to at least  in diameter, with a  pupil (only the extinct ichthyosaurs are known to have had larger eyes). Large eyes can better detect light (including bioluminescent light), which is scarce in deep water. The giant squid probably cannot see color, but it can probably discern small differences in tone, which is important in the low-light conditions of the deep ocean.

Giant squid and some other large squid species maintain neutral buoyancy in seawater through an ammonium chloride solution which is found throughout their bodies and is lighter than seawater. This differs from the method of flotation used by most fish, which involves a gas-filled swim bladder. The solution tastes somewhat like salty liquorice/salmiak and makes giant squid unattractive for general human consumption.

Like all cephalopods, giant squid use organs called statocysts to sense their orientation and motion in water. The age of a giant squid can be determined by "growth rings" in the statocyst's statolith, similar to determining the age of a tree by counting its rings. Much of what is known about giant squid age is based on estimates of the growth rings and from undigested beaks found in the stomachs of sperm whales.

Size 

The giant squid is the second-largest mollusc and one of the largest of all extant invertebrates. It is exceeded only by the colossal squid, Mesonychoteuthis hamiltoni, which may have a mantle nearly twice as long. Several extinct cephalopods, such as the Cretaceous coleoid Yezoteuthis and Haboroteuthis, and the Ordovician nautiloid Endoceras may have grown even larger.

Giant squid size, particularly total length, has often been exaggerated. Reports of specimens reaching and even exceeding  are widespread, but no specimens approaching this size have been scientifically documented. According to giant squid expert Steve O'Shea, such lengths were likely achieved by greatly stretching the two tentacles like elastic bands.

Based on the examination of 130 specimens and of beaks found inside sperm whales, giant squids' mantles are not known to exceed . Including the head and arms, but excluding the tentacles, the length very rarely exceeds .

Giant squid exhibit sexual dimorphism.

Reproductive cycle 
Little is known about the reproductive cycle of giant squid. They are thought to reach sexual maturity at about three years old; males reach sexual maturity at a smaller size than females. Females have a single median ovary in the rear end of the mantle cavity and paired, convoluted oviducts, where mature eggs pass exiting through the oviducal glands, then through the nidamental glands. As in other squid, these glands produce a gelatinous material used to keep the eggs together once they are laid.

In males, as with most other cephalopods, the single, posterior testis produces sperm that move into a complex system of glands that manufacture the spermatophores. These are stored in the elongate sac, or Needham's sac, that terminates in the penis from which they are expelled during mating. The two ventral arms on a male giant squid are hectocotylized, which means they are specialized to facilitate the fertilization of the female's eggs.

How the sperm is transferred to the egg mass is much debated, as giant squid lack the hectocotylus used for reproduction in many other cephalopods. It may be transferred in sacs of spermatophores, called spermatangia, which the male injects into the female's arms. This is suggested by a female specimen recently found in Tasmania, having a small subsidiary tendril attached to the base of each arm.

Post-larval juveniles have been discovered in surface waters off New Zealand, with plans to capture more and maintain them in an aquarium to learn more about the creature. Young giant squid specimens were found off the coast of southern Japan in 2013 and confirmed through genetic analysis.

Another juvenile, approximately 3.7 metres long, was encountered and filmed alive in the harbour in the Japanese city of Toyama on 24 December 2015; after being filmed and viewed by a large number of spectators, including a diver who entered the water to film the squid up close, it was guided out of the harbour into Toyama Bay by the diver.

Genetics
Analysis of the mitochondrial DNA of giant squid individuals from all over the world has found that there is little variation between individuals across the globe (just 181 differing genetic base pairs out of 20,331). This suggests that there is only a single species of giant squid in the world. Squid larvae may be dispersed by ocean currents across vast distances.

Ecology

Feeding 

Recent studies have shown giant squid feed on deep-sea fish and other squid species. They catch prey using the two tentacles, gripping it with serrated sucker rings on the ends. Then they bring it toward the powerful beak, and shred it with the radula (tongue with small, file-like teeth) before it reaches the esophagus. They are believed to be solitary hunters, as only individual giant squid have been caught in fishing nets. Although the majority of giant squid caught by trawl in New Zealand waters have been associated with the local hoki (Macruronus novaezelandiae) fishery, hoki do not feature in the squid's diet. This suggests giant squid and hoki prey on the same animals.

Predators and potential cannibalism 
The known predators of adult giant squid include sperm whales, pilot whales, southern sleeper sharks, and in some regions killer whales. Juveniles may fall prey to other large deep sea predators. Because sperm whales are skilled at locating giant squid, scientists have tried to observe them to study the squid. Giant squid have also been recently discovered to presumably steal food from each other; in mid-to-late October 2016, a  giant squid washed ashore in Galicia, Spain. The squid had been photographed alive shortly before its death by a tourist named Javier Ondicol, and examination of its corpse by the Coordinators for the Study and Protection of Marine Species (CEPESMA) indicates that the squid was attacked and mortally wounded by another giant squid, losing parts of its fins, and receiving damage to its mantle, one of its gills and losing an eye. The intact nature of the specimen indicates that the giant squid managed to escape its rival by slowly retreating to shallow water, where it died of its wounds. The incident is the second to be documented among Architeuthis recorded in Spain, with the other occurring in Villaviciosa. Evidence in the form of giant squid stomach contents containing beak fragments from other giant squid in Tasmania also supports the theory that the species is at least occasionally cannibalistic. Alternatively, such squid-on-squid attacks may be a result of competition for prey. These traits are seen in the Humboldt squid as well, indicating that cannibalism in large squid may be more common than originally thought.

Species 

The taxonomy of the giant squid, as with many cephalopod genera, has long been debated. Lumpers and splitters may propose as many as seventeen species or as few as one. The broadest list is:
 Architeuthis dux, Atlantic giant squid
 Architeuthis (Loligo) hartingii
 Architeuthis japonica
 Architeuthis kirkii
 Architeuthis (Megateuthis) martensii, North Pacific giant squid
 Architeuthis physeteris
 Architeuthis sanctipauli, southern giant squid
 Architeuthis (Steenstrupia) stockii
 Architeuthis (Loligo) bouyeri
 Architeuthis clarkei
 Architeuthis (Plectoteuthis) grandis
 Architeuthis (Megaloteuthis) harveyi
 Architeuthis longimanus
 Architeuthis monachus? 
 Architeuthis nawaji
 Architeuthis princeps
 Architeuthis (Dubioteuthis) physeteris
 Architeuthis titan
 Architeuthis verrilli
It is unclear if these are distinct species, as no genetic or physical basis for distinguishing between them has yet been proposed.

In the 1984 FAO Species Catalogue of the Cephalopods of the World, Roper, et al. wrote:

In Cephalopods: A World Guide (2000), Mark Norman writes:

In March 2013, researchers at the University of Copenhagen suggested that, based on DNA research, there is only one species:

Timeline 

Aristotle, who lived in the fourth century BC, described a large squid, which he called teuthus, distinguishing it from the smaller squid, the teuthis. He mentions, "of the calamaries, the so-called teuthus is much bigger than the teuthis; for teuthi [plural of teuthus] have been found as much as five ells long".

Tales of giant squid have been common among mariners since ancient times, and may have led to the Norse legend of the kraken, a tentacled sea monster as large as an island capable of engulfing and sinking any ship. Japetus Steenstrup, the describer of Architeuthis, suggested a giant squid was the species described as a sea monk to the Danish king Christian III circa 1550. The Lusca of the Caribbean and Scylla in Greek mythology may also derive from giant squid sightings. Eyewitness accounts of other sea monsters like the sea serpent are also thought to be mistaken interpretations of giant squid.

Steenstrup wrote a number of papers on giant squid in the 1850s. He first used the term "Architeuthus" (this was the spelling he chose) in a paper in 1857. A portion of a giant squid was secured by the French corvette Alecton in 1861, leading to wider recognition of the genus in the scientific community. From 1870 to 1880, many squid were stranded on the shores of Newfoundland. In 1873, a squid "attacked" a minister and a young boy in a dory near Bell Island, Newfoundland. Many strandings also occurred in New Zealand during the late 19th century.

Although strandings continue to occur sporadically throughout the world, none have been as frequent as those at Newfoundland and New Zealand in the 19th century. It is not known why giant squid become stranded on shore, but it may be because the distribution of deep, cold water where squid live is temporarily altered. Many scientists who have studied squid mass strandings believe they are cyclical and predictable. The length of time between strandings is not known, but was proposed to be 90 years by Architeuthis specialist Frederick Aldrich. Aldrich used this value to correctly predict a relatively small stranding that occurred between 1961 and 1968.

In 2004, another giant squid, later named "Archie", was caught off the coast of the Falkland Islands by a fishing trawler. It was put on display on 1 March 2006 at the Darwin Centre. The find of such a large, complete specimen is very rare, as most specimens are in a poor condition, having washed up dead on beaches or been retrieved from the stomachs of dead sperm whales.

Researchers undertook a painstaking process to preserve the body. It was transported to England on ice aboard the trawler; then it was defrosted, which took about four days. The major difficulty was that thawing the thick mantle took much longer than the tentacles. To prevent the tentacles from rotting, scientists covered them in ice packs, and bathed the mantle in water. Then they injected the squid with a formol-saline solution to prevent rotting. The creature is now on show in a  glass tank at the Darwin Centre of the Natural History Museum.

In December 2005, the Melbourne Aquarium in Australia paid A$100,000 for the intact body of a  giant squid, preserved in a giant block of ice, which had been caught by fishermen off the coast of New Zealand's South Island that year.

The number of known giant squid specimens was close to 700 in 2011, and new ones are reported each year. Around 30 of these specimens are exhibited at museums and aquaria worldwide. The Museo del Calamar Gigante in Luarca, Spain, had by far the largest collection on public display, but many of the museum's specimens were destroyed during a storm in February 2014.

The search for a live Architeuthis specimen includes attempts to find live young, including larvae. The larvae closely resemble those of Nototodarus and Onykia, but are distinguished by the shape of the mantle attachment to the head, the tentacle suckers, and the beaks.

Images and video of live animals 
By the turn of the 21st century, the giant squid remained one of the few extant megafauna to have never been photographed alive, either in the wild or in captivity. Marine biologist and author Richard Ellis described it as "the most elusive image in natural history". In 1993, an image purporting to show a diver with a live giant squid (identified as Architeuthis dux) was published in the book European Seashells. However, the animal in this photograph was a sick or dying Onykia robusta, not a giant squid. The first footage of live (larval) giant squid ever captured on film was in 2001. The footage was shown on Chasing Giants: On the Trail of the Giant Squid on the Discovery Channel.

First images of live adult 

The first image of a live mature giant squid was taken on 15 January 2002, on Goshiki beach, Amino Cho, Kyoto Prefecture, Japan. It was captured and tied to a quay, where it died overnight. The specimen was identified by Koutarou Tsuchiya of the Tokyo University of Fisheries. It is on display at the National Science Museum of Japan.

First observations in the wild 
The first photographs of a live giant squid in its natural habitat were taken on 30 September 2004, by Tsunemi Kubodera (National Science Museum of Japan) and Kyoichi Mori (Ogasawara Whale Watching Association). Their teams had worked together for nearly two years to accomplish this. They used a five-ton fishing boat and only two crew members. The line also held a camera and a flash. After over twenty tries that day, an  giant squid attacked the lure and snagged its tentacle. The camera took over 500 photos before the squid managed to break free after four hours. The squid's  tentacle remained attached to the lure. Later DNA tests confirmed the animal as a giant squid.

On 27 September 2005, Kubodera and Mori released the photographs to the world. The researchers were able to locate the likely general location of giant squid by closely tailing the movements of sperm whales. According to Kubodera, "we knew that they fed on the squid, and we knew when and how deep they dived, so we used them to lead us to the squid". Kubodera and Mori reported their observations in the journal Proceedings of the Royal Society.

Among other things, the observations demonstrate actual hunting behaviors of adult Architeuthis, a subject on which there had been much speculation. The photographs showed an aggressive hunting pattern by the baited squid, leading to it impaling a tentacle on the bait ball's hooks. This may disprove the theory that the giant squid is a drifter which eats whatever floats by, rarely moving so as to conserve energy. It seems the species has a much more aggressive feeding technique.

First video of live adult 

In November 2006, American explorer and diver Scott Cassell led an expedition to the Gulf of California with the aim of filming a giant squid in its natural habitat. The team employed a novel filming method: using a Humboldt squid carrying a specially designed camera clipped to its fin. The footage aired a year later on a History Channel program, MonsterQuest: Giant Squid Found. Cassell subsequently distanced himself from this documentary, claiming that it contained multiple factual and scientific errors. Videos of live giant squids have been captured three times subsequently, with one of these aforementioned individuals being guided back into the open ocean after appearing in Toyama Harbor on December 24, 2015.

Second video of giant squid in natural habitat
On 19 June 2019, in an expedition run by the National Oceanic & Atmospheric Association (NOAA), known as the Journey to Midnight, biologists Nathan J. Robinson and Edith Widder captured a video of a juvenile giant squid at a depth of 759 meters (2,490 feet) in the Gulf of Mexico.

Cultural depictions 

The elusive nature of the giant squid and its foreign appearance, often perceived as terrifying, have firmly established its place in the human imagination. Representations of the giant squid have been known from early legends of the kraken through books such as Moby-Dick and Twenty Thousand Leagues Under the Sea on to novels such as Ian Fleming's Dr. No, Peter Benchley's Beast (adapted as a film called The Beast), and Michael Crichton Sphere (adapted as a film), and modern animated television programs.

In particular, the image of a giant squid locked in battle with a sperm whale is a common one, although the squid is the whale's prey and not an equal combatant.

See also 
 Colossal squid, the largest squid species by mass
 Enteroctopus, a genus whose members are commonly known as giant octopuses
 Giant Squid Interpretation Site, a small museum in Glovers Harbour, Newfoundland
 Gigantic octopus, a hypothesised species of octopus
 Humboldt squid, a large species of squid and the only member of the genus Dosidicus
 Largest living organisms
 Taningia danae, a large squid species of the genus Taningia

References

Further reading

External links 

 Tree of Life Web Project: Architeuthis
 TONMO.com's fact sheet for giant and colossal squids
 TONMO.com's giant squid reproduction article
 Giant squid – Smithsonian Ocean Portal
 New Zealand – 1999 Expedition Journals In Search of Giant Squid

 
Cephalopods described in 1860